Papilio aristor, the scarce Haitian swallowtail, is a species of butterfly in the family Papilionidae. It is endemic to Hispaniola (the Dominican Republic and Haiti).

Description
Forewing with two rows of yellow spots; the discal row curved, not extending to the hindmargin, the outer row complete; hindwing with a row of yellow spots. Underside of the forewing with a yellow spot in the cell.

References

External links
External images

aristor
Butterflies described in 1819
Taxonomy articles created by Polbot
Taxa named by Jean-Baptiste Godart
Insects of the Dominican Republic
Insects of Haiti